Harley and the Davidsons is a 2016 American television miniseries directed by Ciarán Donnelly and Stephen Kay, and co-written by Nick Schenk, Evan Wright and Seth Fisher which dramatizes the origins of motorcycle manufacturer Harley-Davidson, and how Arthur Davidson founded the company together with his brothers Walter Davidson, Sr. and William A. Davidson, along with their childhood friend William S. Harley.

It stars Robert Aramayo as William Harley, Bug Hall as Arthur Davidson and Michiel Huisman as Walter Davidson, and premiered on the Discovery Channel as a "three-night event series" on September 5, 2016.

Cast
Starring
 Michiel Huisman as Walter Davidson
 Bug Hall as Arthur Davidson
 Robert Aramayo as Bill Harley
Supporting cast

 Daniel Coonan as William "Big Bill" Davidson
 Gabriel Luna as Eddie Hasha
 Philip Brodie as George M. Hendee
 Tommy Bastow as Otto Walker
 Wilson Bethel as Ray Weishaar
 Alex Shaffer as Albert "Shrimp" Burns
 Dougray Scott as Randall James
 Stephen Rider as William B. Johnson
 Jessica Camacho as Reya
 Sean H. Scully as Walter C. Davidson
 Annie Read as Anna Jachthuber/Anna Harley
 Essa O'Shea as Clara Beisel/Clara Davidson
 Hera Hilmar as Emma Rosenheim/Emma Davidson

Episodes

Historical accuracy
While the series is largely based on actual events, and is lauded for its use of reproductions of motorcycles from the era, a number of creative liberties were made for dramatic effect, notably with the rivalry between Harley and Indian, with George Hendee and the fictional Randell James being portrayed as arrogant and manipulative executives bent at defeating Harley through underhanded corporate schemes such as patent trolling and bribery.

Some of the races and other subplots depicted in the miniseries were either fictitious or highly dramatized, particularly when Hendee challenges his competitors to an endurance contest hosted by his company, culminating in a fist fight between Hendee and Walter Davidson over dealership owners being bribed into selling Indian motorcycles exclusively, and a heated argument between the Davidson brothers following the dealership bribery incident.

Eddie Hasha's death was downplayed in the Motordrome sequence, where he collided into a wall after avoiding a fellow racer; in reality Hasha's motorcycle suddenly turned sharply into the rail surrounding the track, killing a boy who had put his head over the rail to watch the race. The racer flew out into the grandstands, killing him instantly. Three other boys and a young man were also killed. In addition, Hasha's involvement with the company in the first episode was exaggerated and expanded upon, although he did indeed become friends with co-founder Arthur Davidson when he worked at a Dallas dealership and raced a motorcycle loaned by the company, in contrast to not being able to represent Harley and betraying in favor of Indian as depicted in the miniseries.

Arthur Davidson's proposal of 20,000 motorcycles to the United States military for World War I was also fictionalized; Indian provided 41,000 units for the military effort while Harley produced 15,000.

While the founders unveiled their 1936 EL at an outlaw race in the third episode, a pre-production version of the real-world EL was revealed in a 1935 dealers convention at the Schroeder Hotel in Milwaukee. In addition, the Knucklehead moniker as mentioned by Bill Harley didn't come into popular use until after World War II, when a revision to the OHV engine, later known as the Panhead, was introduced.

Reception
On the review aggregation website Rotten Tomatoes, the miniseries has an approval rating of 80% based on ten reviews, with an average rating of 5.9/10. The site's critics consensus reads: "Good acting and fun action sequences lift Harley and the Davidsons from longform advertisement into a celebration of the storied motorcycle brand." On Metacritic, Harley and the Davidsons holds a score of 57 out of 100, based on eight critics, indicating "mixed or average reviews".

Larry Lawrence of the motorcycling news magazine CycleNews gave the series a mixed to negative review, stating that it was "by most accounts a highly entertaining watch", but was critical of the highly dramatized portrayal of the company and its founders, particularly the Harley/Indian rivalry which culminated in an unresolved cliffhanger with the infringement case in the second episode, and the events of the third episode, where Harley unveiled their new motorcycle in a (fictional) outlaw race.

Reaction from the company
The show received positive reception from Harley-Davidson themselves. Bill Davidson, great-grandson of the original founders, and Bill Jackson, head of the company archives at the Harley-Davidson Museum, commended the producers' efforts in recreating the motorcycles and the era, saying "they really did their homework", but noted William A. Davidson's reduced role in the story despite the latter being one of the key founders.

References

External links

Harley-Davidson
Motorcycle television series
2010s American drama television miniseries
2016 American television series debuts
2016 American television series endings
English-language television shows
Television series by All3Media
Television series set in the 1900s
Television series set in the 1910s
Television series set in the 1920s
Television series set in the 1930s
Great Depression television series
Discovery Channel original programming
American television docudramas
Films about companies
Films directed by Stephen Kay